The Committee for the Salvation of the Homeland and the Revolution was a brief counterrevolutionary organ created in Petrograd on the night of November 7–8, 1917, during the storming of the Winter Palace by the Bolsheviks, after the procession participants returned to the building of the City Duma to help the revolutionary government besieged in their residence in order to fight against the Bolsheviks.

The Committee included representatives of the Petrograd City Council, the Pre-Parliament, the Central Executive Committee of the Soviets of the First Convocation, the executive committee of the All–Russian Council of Peasant Deputies, the Central Executive Committee of the Navy, the Central Committees of the Menshevik, Socialist Revolutionary, "People's Socialist", Constitutional Democratic parties, the postal–telegraph and railway unions, factions of the Mensheviks and Socialist Revolutionaries, who left the Second All-Russian Congress of Soviets and others. The right–wing Social Revolutionary Abram Gotz was elected Chairman of the committee.

The committee distributed anti–Bolshevik leaflets, supported the strike of civil servants and the campaign of Kerensky–Krasnov to Petrograd, organized an armed uprising of junkers in Petrograd itself, the Mensheviks and Socialist–Revolutionaries who left the Second All-Russian Congress of Soviets and others.

According to John Reed's testimony, the committee had already posted a petition in Petrograd on November 8 stating the illegality of the Bolshevik government, declared its intention to recreate the Provisional Government, which "will bring the country to the Constituent Assembly and save it from counter-revolution and anarchy", and urged citizens not to recognize illegal power Bolsheviks and stand up "to defend the homeland and revolution".

On October 29, the Committee for the Salvation of the Homeland and the Revolution launched an anti-Bolshevik uprising in Petrograd. The Engineering Castle became the center of the uprising, and the main armed force – the cadets of the Nikolaev Engineering School who were stationed in it. Georgy Polkovnikov, the commander of the Petrograd Military District, deposed by the Bolsheviks, declared himself the commander of the "rescue forces" and, by his order, forbade parts of the district to obey the orders of the Military Revolutionary Committee. For some time, the rebels managed to seize the telephone station and disconnect Smolny, arrest part of the commissars of the Military Revolutionary Committee and begin disarming the Red Guards. However, the bulk of the troops of the Petrograd garrison did not join the uprising. By 11 a.m. on October 29, the forces of the Military Revolutionary Committee recaptured the telephone exchange and surrounded the Engineering Castle with superior forces. The uprising was finally suppressed by the morning of October 30.

In parallel, the forces of the Military Revolutionary Committee blocked a number of cadet schools in Petrograd, which in some cases was accompanied by victims. Particularly stubborn resistance was provided by the Vladimir School, where up to 200 people died on both sides, during the assault artillery was used.

At the end of November 1917, the committee was transformed into the "Union for the Defense of the Constituent Assembly", which also included representatives of other parties; the right-wing Social Revolutionary Vasily Filippovsky became the chairman. After the dissolution of the Constituent Assembly, the Union self-destructed.

See also
Uprising of junkers in Petrograd

Sources
The Committee for the Salvation of the Homeland and the Revolution / Lyudmila Novikova // Great Russian Encyclopedia: in 35 Volumes / Editor-in-Chief Yuri Osipov – Moscow: Great Russian Encyclopedia, 2004–2017
Union of Defense of the Constituent Assembly / Vasily Kudryakov // Great Russian Encyclopedia: in 35 Volumes / Editor-in-Chief Yuri Osipov – Moscow: Great Russian Encyclopedia, 2004–2017

Organizations of the Russian Revolution
Political organizations based in Russia